She's Dressed to Kill is a 1979 American television slasher film directed by Gus Trikonis and starring Jessica Walter, John Rubinstein, Connie Sellecca, Jim McMullan, Clive Revill, and Gretchen Corbett. Its plot follows a fashion designer who holds a party at her mansion, where the guests begin to get murdered. The film was also known under the title Someone's Killing the World's Greatest Models.

Cast

Release
The film aired on NBC as a Movie of the Week on Monday, December 10, 1979.

Critical response
People magazine wrote of the film: "It’s your basic people-trapped-at-isolated-snowy-resort-with-murderer tale, but suspenseful."

Legacy
The film is cited by Camille Paglia in an essay featured in her book Provocations: Collected Essays on Art, Feminism, Politics, Sex, and Education (1985).

References

External links

1979 films
American mystery films
American slasher films
Films about modeling
Films shot in California
American horror television films
1970s slasher films
Films directed by Gus Trikonis
1970s American films